Troy Douglas (born 30 November 1962 in Paget, Bermuda) is a former Dutch sprinter. Originally competing for Bermuda, he finished second at the 1995 IAAF World Indoor Championships in the 200 metres event, but he changed nationality to the Netherlands in 1998. For Bermuda he participated at the 1988, 1992 and 1996 Summer Olympics, reaching the semi finals on the 200 metres in 1996 as well as the semi finals on the 400 metres in 1992 and 1996. He finished 5th in the final of the 200 metres at the 1991 Pan American Games.

Set to compete in the 1999 World Championships, Douglas was withdrawn after testing positive for the banned anabolic steroid nandrolone. After his suspension he ran his personal best times over 100 metres and 200 metres in 2001 as well as two masters world records on the same distances in 2003. Together with Patrick van Balkom, Timothy Beck and Caimin Douglas he won a bronze medal in 4×100 metres relay at the 2003 World Championships in Athletics. They also participated with the same team in the 2004 Summer Olympics, but were eliminated in the series due to a mistake in an exchange.

Personal bests
100 metres - 10.19 (2001)
200 metres - 20.19 (2001)
400 metres - 45.26 (1996)

Masters World Records
Men's 40-44yo 100 metres - 10.29 secs (7 June 2003)
Men's 40-44yo 200 metres - 20.64 secs (9 and 27 Aug. 2003)

See also
List of doping cases in athletics

External links

 Masters T&F 100 metres Dash All-Time Rankings M35 10.16 M40 10.29
 Masters T&F 200 metres Dash All-Time Rankings M35 20.19 M40 20.64
 Masters T&F 400 metres Dash All-Time Rankings M40 48.61

1962 births
Living people
Bermudian male sprinters
Dutch male sprinters
Olympic athletes of Bermuda
Olympic athletes of the Netherlands
Athletes (track and field) at the 1988 Summer Olympics
Athletes (track and field) at the 1992 Summer Olympics
Athletes (track and field) at the 1996 Summer Olympics
Athletes (track and field) at the 2004 Summer Olympics
Dutch sportspeople in doping cases
Doping cases in athletics
World record holders in masters athletics
Athletes (track and field) at the 1987 Pan American Games
Athletes (track and field) at the 1991 Pan American Games
Athletes (track and field) at the 1995 Pan American Games
Pan American Games competitors for Bermuda
Athletes (track and field) at the 1990 Commonwealth Games
Athletes (track and field) at the 1994 Commonwealth Games
Commonwealth Games competitors for Bermuda
World Athletics Championships medalists
World Athletics Championships athletes for Bermuda
World Athletics Championships athletes for the Netherlands
People from Paget Parish
World Athletics Indoor Championships medalists